Kaiyil Oru Kodi, Are You Ready? (English: ten million in your hand, Are you ready?) was a 2012-2012 Indian game show presented on 10 March 2012 and 28 October 2012, Sun TV in Tamil. It's the official Tamil adaptation of the British game show, The Million Pound Drop Live. The show was hosted by Rishi.

Game rules
There were seven questions. The game was composed of 50 bundles of ₹2 lakh, for a total of ₹1 crore. Contestants had to place all their money on the trapdoors for each question. Each question had a 60-second time limit. Question 1 to 3 had 4 possible answers, of which the contestants could only cover 3 trap doors. Questions 4, 5 and 6 have three possible answers, of which the contestants could only cover 2 trap doors. Question 7 had two possible answers, of which the contestants could only cover 1 trap door: an all or nothing chance. The contestants were always given a choice of 2 categories for each question.

Rishi did not touch the money, it was up to the contestants to move the money around, whether placing it on the trapdoors or removing it. The maximum time for debate before the 60 second clock started was at the discretion of the producers, but was usually between 15 and 30 seconds. There was no electronic device to work out the amount of money on each trapdoor, this was up to Rishi.

Reception
Sun TV received mention in the press for choosing to go with Rishi as the anchor as opposed to movie-stars who were failing to hold TV audiences' attention.

References

External links

Sun TV original programming
Tamil-language reality television series
2010s Tamil-language television series
Tamil-language game shows
Tamil-language talk shows
2012 Tamil-language television series debuts
Tamil-language television shows
2012 Tamil-language television series endings
Indian game shows
Indian reality television series
Indian television series
Tamil-language television series based on American television series